South Derbyshire is a constituency represented in the House of Commons of the UK Parliament since 2010 by Heather Wheeler, a Conservative.

Boundaries 

1832–1868: The Hundreds of Appletree, Morleston and Litchurch, and Repton and Gresley, and so much of the Wapentake of Wirksworth as was not comprised in the Bakewell Division.

1868–1885: The Hundreds of Repton and Gresley, Morleston and Litchurch, and Appletree.

1885–1918: The Municipal Borough of Derby, the Sessional Divisions of Repton and Swadlincote, and parts of the Sessional Divisions of Ashbourne and Derby.

1918–1950: The Urban Districts of Alvaston and Boulton, Long Eaton, and Swadlincote, the Rural Districts of Hartshorne and Seals, and Shardlow, and part of the Rural District of Repton.

1983–1997: The District of South Derbyshire, and the City of Derby wards of Boulton, Chellaston, and Mickleover.

1997–2010: The District of South Derbyshire, and the City of Derby wards of Boulton and Chellaston.

2010–present: The District of South Derbyshire.

South Derbyshire constituency covers Derbyshire to the south of the city of Derby, forming a tapering salient surrounded by Staffordshire and Leicestershire.

The constituency was originally created after the Reform Act in 1832 when Derbyshire was divided into North Derbyshire and South Derbyshire.

The present constituency was created in 1983 from parts of the seats of Derby North, Derby South, Belper, and South East Derbyshire. When Parliament implemented the plans of the Boundary Commission's Fourth Periodic Review of Westminster constituencies 1995 that came into effect for 1997, Mickleover ward was transferred to Derby South. Under the Fifth Periodic Review of Westminster constituencies, approved for the 2010 general election, the constituency shed the two City of Derby wards to become coterminous with its district.

Constituency profile
This constituency consists of rural and semi-rural settlements, including Repton (with its famous public school), in which a majority of voters have, in local elections since World War II, been Tory-voting, plus more historically industrial, and manufacturing-focussed settlements such as Swadlincote where the electorate has been for the most part Labour-voting.

Workless claimants were in November 2012 significantly lower than the national average of 3.8%, at 2.2% of the population based on a statistical compilation by The Guardian, and very close to that of the Mid Derbyshire seat, at 1.9%.  Also similar is the regionally lowest jobseeker seat of Derbyshire Dales, with only 1.5% of the population registered as jobseekers.

Members of Parliament

MPs 1832–1885

MPs 1885–1950

MPs since 1983

Elections

Elections in the 2010s

Elections in the 2000s

Elections in the 1990s

Elections in the 1980s

Election in the 1940s

Elections in the 1930s

Elections in the 1920s

Elections in the 1910s

Elections in the 1900s

Elections in the 1890s

Elections in the 1880s

Elections in the 1870s

Elections in the 1860s

 
 

 Caused by Gresley's death.

Elections in the 1850s

Elections in the 1840s

 Caused by Mundy's death

Elections in the 1830s

See also 
 List of parliamentary constituencies in Derbyshire

Notes

References

Parliamentary constituencies in Derbyshire
Constituencies of the Parliament of the United Kingdom established in 1832
Constituencies of the Parliament of the United Kingdom disestablished in 1950
Constituencies of the Parliament of the United Kingdom established in 1983